Vice admiral Cristóbal Colón de Carvajal y Maroto, 17th Duke of Veragua, 16th Duke of la Vega, 18th Marquess of Aguilafuente, 15th Marquess of Jamaica, GE (born 29 January 1925 – 6 February 1986) was a Spanish Navy officer, statesman and descendant of Christopher Columbus. He was, for four decades, Admiral of the Ocean Sea, Admiral of the Indies and Adelantado of the Indies, positions that had been held by his father and all of his direct paternal ancestors up to Christopher Columbus, who took on the duties with the Discovery of America in 1492.

In 1986, Colón de Carvajal and his personal driver were killed by Basque separatist group Euskadi Ta Askatasuna (ETA), which had opened fire at the car they were travelling in and tossed a hand grenade inside, near Paseo de la Castellana in Madrid, Spain. Along with the assassination of Carrero Blanco in 1973, he was the most prominent figure to have been assassinated by the organization.

Early life

Colón was born in Madrid to a prominent noble family who held numerous titles in the peerage of Spain. His father, Ramón Colón de Carvajal y Hurtado de Mendoza, 16th Duke of Veragua was born in Madrid in 1898. His mother, María Eulalia Maroto y Pérez del Pulgar, was born in 1897 to the Marquess of Santo Domingo and his wife, the Marchioness of Pozoblanco. Through his mother, Colón was a great-grandson of Carlist general Rafael Maroto.

Career

Early career

He entered as an applicant at the Escuela Naval Militar in 1943, as a component of the 348 Promotion of the General Corps. He was promoted to officer cadet in 1945, to conclude his training at the Escuela Naval on 15 December 1948, at which time he was delivered the office of alférez de navío. His first post was in the flagship of the Spanish Fleet, Canarias.

Admiral of the Ocean Sea

With his commission as an officer in 1948, Colón succeeded his late father as Admiral of the Ocean Sea, Admiral of the Indies and Adelantado of the Indies at the early age of 23.

After being Second Commander of the Tugboat Cíclope, he received the command of the patrolman Lanzón (V-18). When he was promoted to lieutenant of ship, he received the command of the coastguard Pegaso, and after completing the specialist course in Submarine Weapons, he was handed the command of the tugboat in functions of Patrolman RR-20.

He was promoted to Corvette captain in 1964 and appointed second commander of the destroyer , later moving to the Ministry of the Navy. By this time Colón had already become popular amongst the navy staff, and had built a good reputation.

He was promoted to the rank of frigate captain in 1975, and by Decree Law on 17 December 1977, he was given command of the Fletcher-class destroyer Almirante Valdés (D-23) (former USS Converse (DD-509), one of the destroyers granted by the US) which he held until 18 June 1979. During his time as  frigate captain, he was awarded the Silver Medal of the Salvation Society of the Shipwrecked, for having rescued the seventeen members of the fishing crew of Onubenses, which sunk.

When he was promoted in 1980 to ship captain, he was given the command of the training ship of the Spanish Navy, the  barquentine Juan Sebastian Elcano. As ship captain, he departed on 8 January 1981 from Cadiz with course to Santa Cruz de Tenerife, Rio de Janeiro, Montevideo, Buenos Aires, Punta Arenas, Valparaíso, Callao, Balboa, crossed the Panama Canal and cruised to Pensacola, New York, Saint-Malo, Melilla, Livorno and arrived to the Bay of Cádiz 3 August of the same year.

He was promoted to the rank of rear admiral in 1983, and continued with his duties within the Ministry of Defence and especially in the Institute of Naval History and Culture. In 1984 he was promoted to vice admiral, and went on to hold office in the Navy Staff.

Death

Assassination

The attack took place on Thursday 6 February 1986 at 10:20 a.m. His car, a brown Talbot 1800 driven by 55-year-old chauffeur Manuel Trillo, occupied by vice admiral Colón de Carvajal and his assistant, 45-year-old Antonio Rodríguez Toube, who was in the back seat of the car, was headed down Calle del Tambre from the corner with Balbina Valverde. The chauffeur had to reduce speed when reaching a narrow part of the road. According to witnesses, two young men "posted on both sides of the street, machine-gunned the vehicle in crossfire." Almost at the same time, one of the ETA members tossed a hand grenade inside the vehicle, while the other members of the commando continued firing from the opposite sidewalk.

In spite of the bloodshed, commander Antonio Rodríguez Toube, Colón's personal assistant, was severely wounded but survived the attack almost miraculously.

Funeral

The funeral for the Duke of Veragua and driver Manuel Trillo was held the following morning, at the General Headquarters of the Navy, in Madrid. The remains of both victims were buried that afternoon.

Honours

Grandee of Spain
Grand Cross of the Order of Isabella the Catholic
Grand Cross of the Order of the Civil recognition (posthumous)
Grand Cross of Naval Merit (white distinction)
Grand Cross of the Order of Christopher Columbus
Cross of the Royal and Military Order of Saint Hermenegild
Knight of the Order of Santiago
Cross of the Order of Vasco Núñez de Balboa
Cross of the Order of May
Cross of the Order of Merit of Chile
Cross of the Naval Merit of Peru
Cross of Naval Merit of Brazil
Cross of the Special Merit of Mexico
Commemorative medal of the 400th anniversary of the Battle of Lepanto
Fellow of the Royal Academy of History
Fellow of honour of the Royal Academy of Social and Natural Sciences of Extremadura
Fellow of the Italian Academy of History
Fellow of the Dominican Academy of History
Fellow of the Paraguayan Academy of History
Fellow of the Porto Rican Academy of History
Member of the Permanent Commission of the Deputation of the Grandeza of Spain
President of the Royal Body of Nobility of Madrid
President of the Royal Association of Noblemen of Spain
Spokesperson of the Naval Museum of Madrid
Member of the Commission of the 500th anniversary of the Discovery of America
President and founder of the Italo-Hispanic Cultural Association "Christopher Columbus".
President of the Spanish Scouts (Bestowed with the "Silver Wolf", highest scout distinction)

Arms

See also
Christopher Columbus

References

Further reading

External links 
 Tribute documentary of Cristóbal Colón de Carvajal y Maroto

|-

1925 births
1986 deaths
Assassinated nobility
Cristobal
Deaths by hand grenade
Dukes of Spain
Dukes of Veragua
Grand Crosses of Naval Merit
Grand Crosses of the Order of Christopher Columbus
Grandees of Spain
Knights Grand Cross of the Order of Isabella the Catholic
Knights of Santiago
Nobility from Madrid
People killed by ETA (separatist group)
Recipients of the Royal and Military Order of Saint Hermenegild
Spanish naval officers
1986 murders in Spain